The 2017 Amgen Tour of California was a road cycling stage race that took place between 14 and 20 May. It was the 12th edition of the Tour of California and the 22nd event of the 2017 UCI World Tour; the first time that the race has been staged as part of the World Tour.

New Zealand's George Bennett took the first victory of his professional career, winning the general classification by 35 seconds ahead of Polish rider Rafał Majka, riding for the  team. Majka had held the race lead after winning the second stage ahead of Bennett, but Bennett's superior performance during the penultimate day time trial at Big Bear Lake allowed him to take the race lead, and ultimately the race win. Bennett's win was the first overall win by a rider from New Zealand at UCI World Tour level. The podium was completed by the top home rider,  member Andrew Talansky, a second in arrears of Majka.

In the other classifications, Majka's teammate Peter Sagan won the sprints classification, and its accompanying green jersey, for the seventh time in eight years; Colombian rider Daniel Jaramillo edged out 's Evan Huffman on a countback to win the polka-dot jersey for the mountains classification, while a final-day attack by Australian Lachlan Morton allowed him to regain the white jersey of young rider classification leader that he had lost the previous day to 's Tao Geoghegan Hart. Huffman won the most stages during the race with two, the first time that a UCI Continental team had won on the UCI World Tour.

Teams
As a new event to the UCI World Tour, all UCI WorldTeams were invited to the race, but not obligated to compete in the race. Almost all the competing teams were announced on 9 March 2017, with  added to the field in the week leading up to the race.

As such, twelve of the eighteen WorldTeams competed in the race. Three UCI Professional Continental teams competed, while two UCI Continental teams were also granted permission to compete in the race. Therefore, this completed the 17-team peloton.

Route
For the 2017 edition, the race was shortened from eight stages to seven stages. The full race route was announced on 31 January 2017.

Stages

Stage 1
14 May 2017 — Sacramento to Sacramento,

Stage 2
15 May 2017 — Modesto to San Jose,

Stage 3
16 May 2017 — Pismo Beach to Morro Bay,

Stage 4
17 May 2017 — Santa Barbara to Santa Clarita,

Stage 5
18 May 2017 — Ontario to Mount Baldy,

Stage 6
19 May 2017 — Big Bear Lake to Big Bear Lake, individual time trial (ITT)

Stage 7
20 May 2017 — Mountain High to Pasadena,

Classification leadership table
In the 2017 Tour of California, five different jerseys were awarded. For the general classification, calculated by adding each cyclist's finishing times on each stage, and allowing time bonuses for the first three finishers at intermediate sprints and at the finish of mass-start stages, the leader received a yellow jersey. This classification was considered the most important of the 2017 Tour of California, and the winner of the classification was considered the winner of the race.

Additionally, there was a sprints classification, which awarded a green jersey. In the sprints classification, cyclists received points for finishing in the top 10 in a stage. For winning a stage, a rider earned 15 points, with 12 for second, 9 for third, 7 for fourth with a point fewer per place down to a single point for 10th place. Points towards the classification could also be accrued – awarded on a 3–2–1 scale – at intermediate sprint points during each stage; these intermediate sprints also offered bonus seconds towards the general classification. There was also a mountains classification, the leadership of which was marked by a white jersey with red polka dots. In the mountains classification, points were won by reaching the top of a climb before other cyclists, with more points available for the higher-categorised climbs.

The fourth jersey represented the young rider classification, marked by a predominantly "white design" jersey. This was decided in the same way as the general classification, but only riders born after 1 January 1992 were eligible to be ranked in the classification. There was also a classification for teams, in which the times of the best three cyclists per team on each stage were added together; the leading team at the end of the race was the team with the lowest total time. In addition, there was a combativity award given after each stage to the rider considered, by a jury, to have "who best exemplifies the character of those engaged in the fight against cancer / heart disease", in line with the jersey's sponsors. This award was marked by a blue jersey.

Notes

References

Sources

External links

2017
2017 UCI World Tour
2017 in American sports
May 2017 sports events in the United States